Kraljev Vrh  is a village in Croatia.

Populated places in Zagreb County